6/2 may refer to:
Volleyball#6–2, a volleyball formation
6–2 defense, in American football
June 2 (month-day date notation)
February 6 (day-month date notation)